Mark Alexander Knox (born April 15, 1970), better known as Flex Alexander or Flex, is an American actor, comedian and dancer. He began his career while appearing on numerous of television sitcoms before portraying single father Flex Washington on the UPN sitcom One on One (2001-2006). Alexander also had a number of roles in many films including Modern Vampires (1998), The Force (1999), Out Cold  (2001), Book of Love: The Definitive Reason Why Men Are Dogs (2002), Gas (2004), Snakes on a Plane (2006), and Trigger (2020).

Early life
Born in Harlem, Alexander is the son of Alethia Knox and Robert Whitehead. As a teen, he began dancing in New York night clubs earning the nickname "Flex" due to his acrobatic dance skills. After being discovered by DJ Spinderella, he began touring with rap trio Salt-n-Pepa and remained with the dance troupe for three years. In addition to dancing, Alexander also choreographed for Mary J. Blige and Queen Latifah. In 1989, he made his stand-up comedy debut and eventually turned to acting, making his film debut in the 1992 film Juice. Alexander also was a regular cast member of the sketch comedy show, Uptown Comedy Club, from 1992 to 1994.

Career
Alexander's first television role was on the short-lived 1993 ABC sitcom Where I Live, starring Doug E. Doug. Despite being critically acclaimed, the series was canceled that same year. Alexander then guest starred on episodes of Sister, Sister and The Cosby Mysteries before moving to Los Angeles in 1995 to concentrate on acting. In 1996, he landed a starring role on another short-lived sitcom Homeboys in Outer Space. The series was critically panned and canceled the following year. Later that year, Alexander co-starred in yet another short-lived series, the Steven Bochco-created Total Security. Following Total Security'''s run, Alexander guest starred on Brooklyn South and The Parkers, and also had roles in several films including the 1998 direct-to-video release Backroom Bodega Boyz and She's All That (1999).

From 2000 to 2001, Alexander appeared as Maya Wilkes' husband Darnell during the first season of the UPN sitcom Girlfriends. He left Girlfriends to star as single father Mark "Flex" Washington on the UPN sitcom One on One, a series he created and produced. For his role on the series, Alexander was nominated for three NAACP Image Awards and two BET Comedy Awards. In 2004, he portrayed Michael Jackson in the VH1 television biopic Man In The Mirror: The Michael Jackson Story, which garnered him another NAACP Image Award nomination. He refused to play Jackson with prosthetics, but did mimique his voice, copied mannerisms and had a makeup job done to lighten his skin tone. He also refused to "cast judgement" over the singer's legal troubles of the time and said "we should pray for him". Alexander returned to One on One for two more seasons, however, during the last season, his character was written out and reduced to a recurring role when the show's premise was rebooted.

Following the end of One On One, Alexander had roles in the 2006 film Snakes on a Plane, opposite Samuel L. Jackson, and the 2007 horror film The Hills Have Eyes 2. He also had a role in Clement Virgo's Poor Boy's Game, with Danny Glover. Alexander's most recent role was in a 2007 episode of CSI: Miami. Flex and his wife, Shanice, will have their own reality show Flex & Shanice premiering November 1, 2014, on OWN.

in 2022, Flex was cast as "Pookie" in the stage adaptation of New Jack City: Live on Stage'', written, produced and directed by urban playwright and film producer Je'Caryous Johnson. The production is currently on tour in nine cities.

Personal life
Alexander, a born-again Christian, married R&B singer Shanice Wilson on February 19, 2000. They have two children, daughter Imani Shekinah Alexander-Knox (born August 23, 2001) and son Elijah Alexander-Knox (born March 5, 2004). Alexander is a member of Phi Beta Sigma fraternity.

Filmography

Film

Television

Award nominations

References

External links

1970 births
Living people
Male actors from New York City
African-American male actors
African-American Christians
American choreographers
American male comedians
American male dancers
American male film actors
American male television actors
Television producers from New York City
Comedians from New York City
21st-century American comedians
21st-century African-American people
20th-century African-American people